Henry Parayre (1879-1970) was a French sculptor.

Early life
Henry Parayre was born on 9 July 1879 in Toulouse, France.

Career
Parayre served as the director of the École des Beaux-Arts in Toulouse. Some of his students included André Arbus and Marc Saint-Saëns.

Parayre designed the monument in honor of the French Resistance in Sainte-Radegonde, Aveyron. He also designed sculptures with his former students, Arbus and Saint-Saëns.

His work is in the permanent collection of the Musée Denys-Puech in Rodez. It can also be found at the Musée du Vieux Toulouse.

Personal life and death
Parayre resided in Conques-en-Rouergue, where he died on 3 December 1970.

Works

Further reading

References

1879 births
1970 deaths
French sculptors